The 1910 Toronto Argonauts season was the 27th season for the team since the franchise's inception in 1873. The team finished in second place in the Interprovincial Rugby Football Union with a 3–3 record and failed to qualify for the playoffs.

Pre-season and Exhibition

Regular season
This was the first season in which it became usual for the Montreal Football Club to be referred to as the Winged Wheelers.

Standings

Schedule

References

Toronto Argonauts seasons